Cellario is a surname. Notable people with the surname include:

Francesco Cellario (1520–1569), Italian Protestant pastor
Patrice Cellario (born 1953), Monegasque Interior Minister

See also 

 Cella (surname)

Surnames
Italian-language surnames
Surnames of Italian origin